The Negro Worker was the newspaper of the International Trade Union Committee of Negro Workers.  It was called The International Negro Workers’ Review, when launched in 1928, but the name was changed in March 1931. It ceased publication in 1937.

It was edited first by George Padmore until 1931 and then by James W. Ford.

References

External links
Table of Contents of each issue

Comintern
Communist newspapers
Publications established in 1928
Publications disestablished in 1937